The 2004–05 season was Juventus F.C.'s 107th in existence and 103rd consecutive season in the top flight of Italian football. Juventus won the league title for the 28th time in this season; the following year, Juventus were of this title and sent to Serie B due to the Calciopoli scandal.

Season summary
Juventus Football Club returned to domestic glory in the first season under Fabio Capello's reign. The former Juventus midfielder had a positive influence on the Juventus squad, and it seemed as though he had led the club to its 28th league title. However, that was all to change a year afterwards when Calciopoli sent Juventus to Serie B.

On the pitch in 2004–05, Swedish signing Zlatan Ibrahimović was the biggest positive surprise. Not known as an outright goalscorer at previous club Ajax, Ibrahimović hit the back of the net 16 times in his debut Serie A season. Another signing, Fabio Cannavaro, gave the team the stability it had lacked in the 2003–04 season, and helped the defense to be rock-solid. Juventus conceded just 27 goals throughout the league season and this, combined with the 67 goals scored, gave the club both the best defence and best attack of 2004–05 in Italy.

The lowest point of the season was not being able to get past Liverpool in the quarter-finals Champions League. Sami Hyypiä and Luis García scored early goals at Anfield, from which Juventus could not recover, despite a second half goal by Fabio Cannavaro that meant they could go through to a semi-final showdown with Chelsea if they won the return leg in Turin just 1–0. In this second leg, Ibrahimović missed a golden chance when all he had to do was turn in a Gianluca Zambrotta cross. After that, Juventus failed to pose any threat to the well-organized English side. Liverpool would go on to win the competition.

Players

Squad information

Transfers

Winter

Reserve squad

Competitions

Serie A

League table

Results summary

Results by round

Matches

Coppa Italia

Round of 16

UEFA Champions League

Third qualifying round

Group stage

Knockout phase

Round of 16

Quarter-finals

Statistics

Players statistics

Goalscorers
  Zlatan Ibrahimović 16
  Alessandro Del Piero 14
  David Trezeguet 9
  Pavel Nedvěd 7
  Marcelo Zalayeta 6

References

Juventus F.C. seasons
Juventus